Thomas Sinclair (13 October 1921 – October 2015) was an English professional footballer who played in the Football League for Aldershot, Bradford City and Brentford as an outside forward.

Career statistics

References

1921 births
2015 deaths
English footballers
English Football League players
Brentford F.C. players
People from Ince-in-Makerfield
Association football outside forwards
Gainsborough Trinity F.C. players
Aldershot F.C. players
Bradford City A.F.C. players
Midland Football League players